Tillandsia alfredo-laui is a species of flowering plant in the genus Tillandsia. This species is endemic to Mexico.

References

alfredo-laui
Flora of Mexico